Bhim Singh Dahiya (born 7 April 1938) is an Indian educationist, author and a politician. He was formerly Vice-Chancellor of Kurukshetra University and member of Haryana Legislative Assembly, elected to the assembly from Rohat constituency. Having numerous books to his name, he wrote extensively on literary criticism, educational reforms and politics of Haryana.

Education
Dahiya received his early education in Rohtak, after-which he graduated from Panjab University with a B.Sc. degree in 1960. He received an M.A. in English with distinction from Kurukshetra University in 1963. While teaching, he did Ph.D. from the University of Cincinnati, Ohio, in 1975.

Life and career
Bhim Singh Dahiya was born on 7 April 1938. He started his teaching career as a lecturer at All India Jat Heroes' Memorial College, Rohtak, in 1963 and joined Delhi University in the same capacity in 1964, and then the Kurukshetra University in 1965.

He joined as a teaching fellow in University of Cincinnati's Department of English between 1971 and 1975 and was then awarded the Taft Fellowship for three years in the same university in 1973. During 1976-77, he served as reader at Kurukshetra University. He subsequently joined M.D. University as a professor of English during 1979 and 1980. He was a professor of English at Kurukshetra University from 1987 to 1991. During 1996-98, Dahiya was a senior research fellow at Indian Institute of Advanced Study.

He held multiple administrative positions also. He served as registrar of M.D. University from 1977 to 1979. Later became the Chairman of Department of English at Kurukshetra University from 1991-92. Eventually became the Pro-Vice Chancellor of the same university and remained in the position from 1992 to 1993, finally he was appointed as the Vice-Chancellor in 1993 and held the position up to 1996. During 1996-1998, Dahiya remained on the board of directors of United States Educational Foundation in India (presently known as the United States-India Educational Foundation).

He briefly entered public life and remained Member of the Legislative Assembly (MLA) of Lok Dal party in Haryana Legislative Assembly (Haryana State Legislature), representing Rohat constituency (presently known as Kharkhauda Assembly constituency) from 1982-87.

Dahiya has been President of the Shakespeare Association (India) since its inception in 2008. The Association organises international seminars and discussions on important literary events.

Works 
Dahiya's works include:
 The Hero in Hemingway: A Study in Development. Bahri Publishers, New Delhi, 1978.
 Hemingway’s The Sun Also Rises: A Critical Introduction. Lakeside Publishers, Faridabad, 1986.
 Teaching English Literature. Lakeside Publishers, Faridabad, 1988.
 Poet-critics on Shakespeare. Ajanta International, Delhi, 1991.
 Hemingway's a Farewell to Arms: A Critical Study. Academic Foundation, New Delhi, 1991.
 Major Trends In English Literature (1837-1945). Academic Foundation, New Delhi, 1992.
 Sound in Sense: An Anthology of Poems. Oxford University Press, New Delhi, 1993.
 Higher Education in India: Some Reflections. Khama Publishers, New Delhi, 1996.
 Education in Independent India: Promises, Pressures, Pitfalls. Khosla Publishing House, New Delhi, 1998.
 The University Autonomy in India: The Idea and the Reality. Indian Institute of Advanced Study, Shimla, 2001.
 Objective Type Questions On Literature In English (for UGC's Net). Cee Bee Publications, Delhi, 2004.
 A New History of English Literature. Doaba Publications, New Delhi, 2005.
 Objective Type Questions On Literature In English with Revised Question & Answers. Doaba Publications, New Delhi, 2006.
 Teaching English Literature. Doaba Publications, New Delhi, 2009.
 Farewell to Arms. Doaba Publications, New Delhi, 2009.
 Dr Sarup Singh and His Times: An Anecdotal Account. Shanti Prakashan, Ahmedabad, 2007.
 Power Politics in Haryana: A View from the Bridge. Gyan Publishing House, New Delhi, 2008.
 Postmodern Essays on Love, Sex, and Marriage in Shakespeare. Viva Books, New Delhi, 2008.
 Shakespeare's Intellectual Background. Viva Books, New Delhi, 2008.
 Scholars in Shakespeare: A Postmodern Scrutiny. The Shakespeare Association, Kurukshetra, 2010.
 Shakespeare: A New Biography. The Shakespeare Association, Kurukshetra, 2010.
 Shakespeare's Speculum: Essays on Social Issues. The Shakespeare Association, Kurukshetra, 2011.
 The Rise of Haryana and the Fall of Democracy. Shanti Prakashan, Ahmedabad, 2012.
 Women in Shakespeare: A Post-Feminist Review. Viva Books, New Delhi, 2013.

References 

1938 births
Living people
University of Cincinnati alumni
Kurukshetra University alumni
English literature academics
Shakespearean scholars
Academic staff of Kurukshetra University
Haryana MLAs 1982–1987
20th-century Indian politicians
Lok Dal politicians